The Shenyang Rhinos are a professional arena football team based in Shenyang, Liaoning participating as members of the China Arena Football League (CAFL). They were originally called the Dalian Dragon Kings and were based in Dalian, China. Their home stadium was the Damai Center. In 2017, the Dragon Kings relocated to become the Shenyang Black Rhinos.

Seasons

References

External links
 China Arena Football League official website

China Arena Football League teams
2016 establishments in China
Sport in Dalian
American football teams established in 2016
 
Sport in Shenyang